Pinhook is an unincorporated community in New Durham Township, LaPorte County, Indiana.

History
Pinhook was originally called New Durham. It was platted under the latter name in 1847. 'Pinhook' was at first a derisive nickname given by a neighboring rival town, but it was eventually adopted by the residents of Pinhook themselves.

Geography

References

Unincorporated communities in LaPorte County, Indiana
Unincorporated communities in Indiana